John Lynch (born 26 December 1961) is an Irish actor and novelist from Northern Ireland. He won the AFI (AACTA) Award for Best Actor for the 1995 film Angel Baby. His other film appearances include Cal (1984), The Secret Garden (1993), In the Name of the Father (1993), Sliding Doors (1998), The Fall (2013–2016), Medici (2019), The Head (2020), and The Banishing (2021).

Lynch has also written two novels, Torn Water (2005) and Falling Out of Heaven (2010).

Early life
Lynch was born in Northern Ireland to a Northern Irish father, Fin Lynch, and an Italian mother, Rosina Pavone, better known as Rose. His mother was from Trivento, a town in the Province of Campobasso in Molise, Southern Italy. His parents met in London, where his mother was a teacher. He is the eldest of five children, and was raised as a Catholic. 

In 1968, when he was seven years old, he moved with his family to the townland of Corrinshego, where his father was from, in County Armagh, Northern Ireland. Corrinshego, where he spent the rest of his childhood and teenage years, is on the western outskirts of Newry. Lynch later attended St. Colman's College in Newry. He began acting in Irish language plays at school during the early years of The Troubles in Northern Ireland. His sister Susan and his nephew Thomas Finnegan are also actors.

Career
Lynch has appeared in numerous films related to Northern Ireland's problems such as Cal (1984) with Helen Mirren, for which, hewas nominated for BAFTA Award for Most Promising Newcomer to Leading Film Roles, In the Name of the Father (1993) with Daniel Day-Lewis, The Railway Station Man (1992) with Julie Christie and Donald Sutherland, Nothing Personal and Some Mother's Son (1996), also with Mirren, as well as the Irish-themed film Evelyn (2002). 

He starred as a supporting actor in Derek Jarman's Edward II (1991), as Lord Craven in Agnieska Holland's film of The Secret Garden (1993), as Tadhg in The Secret of Roan Inish (1994), and as Gerry in Sliding Doors (1998).

Lynch played the part of football legend George Best in the 2000 film Best. He played the lead in the Australian feature Angel Baby, winning the Australian Film Institute award for best leading actor and the Australian Film Critics award for best actor of 1995. He was nominated for a Satellite Film Award for the film Moll Flanders in 1996. He worked with acclaimed Belgian director Marion Hansel on her adaptation of Booker-nominated author Damon Galgut's novel, The Quarry (also known as La Faille; 1998), which won Best Film at the Montreal Film Festival. He won Best Actor for the lead role in Best at the Fort Lauderdale Film Festival in 2000. He wrote and co-produced the film.

In 2005, Lynch was nominated for an IFTA for his role in The Baby War. He starred in Five Day Shelter as Stephen, which won a European Film Award and was in competition at the Rome Film Festival. He played the lead in Craig Vivieros' first feature film, the prison drama Ghosted. He played the role of Wollfstan in Black Death, and appeared in the 2012 film version of Michael Morpurgo's novel, Private Peaceful.

Lynch is also a novelist. His first novel, Torn Water, was published in November 2005 by 4th Estate, a literary imprint of HarperCollins, and his second, Falling Out of Heaven, was published on 13 May 2010 by the same publisher.

Personal life
Lynch married film-maker Mary McGuckian in 1997, having met her on the set of Words Upon the Window Pane a few years earlier. They separated in 2008 and later divorced. As of 2023, he resides in Nice with his wife, Christine.

Selected filmography

Awards and nominations

References

External links
 

1961 births
20th-century male actors from Northern Ireland
21st-century male actors from Northern Ireland
Living people
Male film actors from Northern Ireland
Male stage actors from Northern Ireland
Male television actors from Northern Ireland
Male novelists from Northern Ireland
People educated at St Colman's College, Newry
People from Newry
People from Northern Ireland of Italian descent
People of Molisan descent
Best Actor AACTA Award winners